The Fondation Jean Dubuffet is a foundation established by artist Jean Dubuffet (1901–1985) in 1973. Its registered office is on the Rue de Moulin Neuf, Sente des Vaux-Ruelle aux Chevaux, Périgny-sur-Yerres, Val-de-Marne, with the secretariat located in the 6th arrondissement of Paris at 137 Rue de Sèvres, Paris, France. Both are open to the public; an admission fee is charged.

The foundation acquires and conserves Dubuffet's original work, as well as items from his personal collection, including plans, designs and models, gouaches, drawings and prints, notes and manuscripts, documents, etc. It currently contains over 1000 works and over 14,000 photographs of his art. Its main collection is housed in Périgny-sur-Yerres, and open to the public. In addition, the foundation's Paris townhouse, acquired by the artist in 1962, contains an exhibition as well as a center of study.

See also 
 List of museums in Paris
 List of single-artist museums

References 
 Fondation Jean Dubuffet
 Evene.fr description (French)
 Just Tour France description

Art museums and galleries in Île-de-France
Art museums established in 1973
Dubuffet
1973 establishments in France
Buildings and structures in the 6th arrondissement of Paris
Museums in Val-de-Marne
Art museums and galleries in Paris
Dubuffet